Kansaignathus (meaning "jaw from Kansai") is a genus of velociraptorine dromaeosaurid from the Late Cretaceous Ialovachsk Formation of Tajikistan. The genus contains a single species, Kansaignathus sogdianus.

Discovery and naming 
The holotype of Kansaignathus, 2398/15, consists of a right dentary. It was discovered in the Konsoy locality in the north of the Fergana Valley of Tajikistan in the 1960s. The generic name, Kansaignathus, is derived from "Kansai," the Russian name of the location where the holotype specimen was discovered, and the Greek "gnathos," meaning jaw. The specific name, sogdianus, is derived from Sogdiana, an ancient region in Central Asia. It represents the first non-avian dinosaur described from Tajikistan.

Additional remains from the same formation, consisting of sacrum fragments, manual phalanges and a third metatarsal, were referred to Kansaignathus in 2023.

Classification 
Kansaignathus was placed as a basal member of the subfamily Velociraptorinae by Averianov & Lopatin in 2021. Their cladogram is shown below:

References 

Eudromaeosaurs
Santonian genera
Late Cretaceous dinosaurs of Asia
Paleontology in Tajikistan
Fossil taxa described in 2021
Santonian species extinctions
Monotypic dinosaur genera